Hendrik Hahne (born 15 April 1986 in Gronau) is a German footballer who plays for TSV Bemerode.

Career
He joined Hannover 96 in 2000 as a youth player, progressing through the ranks until he finally made his Bundesliga debut on 10 September 2005 in a 2–0 win over Eintracht Frankfurt. He managed seven appearances during this season, but did not feature at all during the 2006–07 campaign.

Trivia
 He is nicknamed "Chicken" within the club, owing to his surname (Hahn meaning rooster in German).
 In 2005, he completed a qualification in business retail.

References

External links
 

1986 births
Living people
German footballers
Bundesliga players
3. Liga players
Hannover 96 players
Hannover 96 II players
SV Babelsberg 03 players
Association football midfielders